Nataliia Volovnyk (born 13 March 1993) is a Ukrainian handball player for polish team  JKS Jarosław and the Ukrainian national team. In 2009—2018 played for SC Galytchanka Lviv and in 2018−2021 played for AZS Politechnika Koszalin.

References

1993 births
Living people
Sportspeople from Ternopil
Ukrainian female handball players